The murder of Hans Pozo refers to a homicide case that began on 27 March 2006, when a boy from the Puente Alto commune, in southern Santiago, Chile, noticed that a stray dog was carrying a human foot that it had apparently found in a nearby landfill.

Discovery 
A day after the discovery of the foot, the Investigations Police found the victim's head in the same sector, with two 9mm bullets, cuts on the cheeks and with a sliced off nose. On March 29, his arms were found, with the hands removed and four tattoos torn off. The day after, his left foot was also discovered.

On April 2, two female plastic collectors reported to the police the discovery of two hands with fingerprints ripped off in a bag at the end of Avenida Santa Rosa, in Puente Alto. The next day, in the commune of San Bernardo, a woman found the victim's torso, with its guts and buttocks removed, inside a garbage container.

Investigation 
Genetic testing was carried out on all the located parts, which confirmed that they indeed belonged to one person, but the police didn't know the decedent's identity with certainty. To find his name, forensic experts reconstructed his ten fingerprints from the edges that were left on his buds and from small flaps of skin that the killer didn't tear off three of his fingers. During the process, a Cupid tattoo which was ignored by the killer also aided the investigators, who photographed it to be shown in various jails around the country, hoping that some prisoner might recognize them. This tactic paid off because one inmate claimed to have made that tattoo to one of his former cellmates, confirming that the victim was recorded in the archives of the Gendarmerie.

Once the portraits of the fingerprints were obtained, they were compared with three registers: those of the Civil Registry, of the Civil Police and the Gendarmerie. At this time, Hans Pozo's name had already been disclosed by the press as a possible identity for the hitherto named "Dismembered of Puente Alto", which was leaked online. His facial composite, made by the Legal Medical Service, was also publicly available by order of the South Metropolitan Prosecutor's Office. Despite thirteen alleged relatives undergoing DNA tests, none tested positive, since Pozo's real family, until then, had not claimed the body or filed a complaint for his alleged death.

Identification 
On April 6, 2006, ten days after the discovery of the first clue, the Investigations Police confirmed that the victim's name was Hans Hernán Pozo Vergara, born in the commune of Independencia on July 2, 1985. Known in his home with the nicknames «El Rucio» and «El Julipi», his last recorded residence was located in San Ramón. After his identification, his family contacted the police. Thereafter, the press reported, among other things, that Pozo had a 3-year-old daughter, had a criminal record for theft and robbery, was a drug addict, sporadically worked as a construction worker and displayed homosexual behavior. According to a report in the newspaper La Cuarta, based on sex workers who knew Pozo, he engaged in the trade near Plaza de Armas in Santiago in 2006. In the same article, the president of Sidacción confirmed that Pozo went to that organization in 2004 to test if he had HIV, although an ELISA test was never performed.

Pozo had been abandoned by his mother at age four, for being the son from a previous relationship. In 2005, Hans went to the Carabineros de Chile to get his mother's address, but when he went to meet her, he was chased away with a knife by his stepbrother. As a child, he went through several orphanages until one of his uncles, Francisco Pozo, began to take care of him, however, when he was 16, Pozo began to take drugs and ended up on the street, as his family couldn't endure his continuous robberies which were to fuel his addiction to cocaine paste.

The prime suspect 
Days before the murder, Hans Pozo spent the night with four men at a shelter at Paradero 30 on Santa Rosa Avenue. When they were separately interviewed by the Homicide Squad, all mentioned the surname "Martínez".

Thanks to forensic entomology carried out by the Carabineros' Criminalistics Laboratory, the authorities were able to determine that the killer had refrigerated the remains before dumping them in various areas around the city. According to the researchers, the fly larvae present in Pozo's remains had the same level of development. Furthermore, due to the size of the victim's body, it was deduced that it couldn't have been kept in a domestic refrigerator, but an industrial one. This led the investigators to 41-year-old Jorge Iván Martínez Arévalo, an official from La Pintana and owner of an ice cream parlor located next to his home, also at Paradero 30 in Santa Rosa. When the authorities went to Martínez's house for questioning, he was not there, so he was summoned to testify. At the same time, the prosecutor in charge of the case, Pablo Sabaj, gave the order to the OS9 group to investigate further.

On the afternoon of April 8, 2006, the OS9 operatives entered the Martínez ice cream parlor for a routine interview. According to the Carabineros, upon hearing them enter, the suspect ran to his bedroom, screamed for a couple seconds and committed suicide by shooting himself in the head. This version was refuted by Martínez's relatives, especially his brother and colleague, Robinson, who claimed that the Carabineros entered the house and shot Jorge twice.

After Martínez's death, his wife found a twenty-page suicide note at his home, in which he explained the type of relationship he had with Hans Pozo. In the note, Martínez claimed that Pozo was extorting him because he was his biological son and constantly threatened with revealing the secret to his family. According to Jorge, to avoid this, he contacted two police officials - who were never identified - who, in exchange for money, would intimidate Hans by jailing him for some time. However, when he saw the news about the "Dismembered of Puente Alto", Martínez knew that it was Pozo, seeing himself involved in a bigger problem. He also admitted his cowardice and his intention to "disappear". What triggered him to write the note was an alleged extortion by the hired killers, who were demanding more money from him for their work.

Martínez constantly gave Pozo money in the face of his threats. He believed that Hans was his son, because in 1984, he had a brief relationship with a blonde woman. However, after his death, a DNA paternity test was performed and ruled out any relation between the two men.

On May 3, 2006, the OS9 group collected biological samples from Martínez's ice cream parlor. There, using luminol, a blood stain that had been washed off was detected. The stain corresponded to Pozo, and by its shape, it was deduced that the corpse had been in that place after being shot. Later, Martínez's brothers, after questioned by prosecutor Sabaj, assured the press that they themselves were wounded once and that the blood was theirs. They also denounced the Carabineros, claiming that they tried to implicate them in Pozo's death, which they flatly denied. More blood samples were found in Martínez's van, specifically in the passenger seat and the back seat, which also belonged to Pozo.

Funeral 
On Friday, April 14, 2006, the Legal Medical Service delivered Hans Pozo's remains to his adoptive family, who organized a wake for him at the "La Casona", in La Pintana. The next day, some three hundred people accompanied him at his funeral, which ended at the Jardin Sacramental cemetery in San Bernardo.

On May 5, 2006, Pozo's ex-partner and mother of his daughter filed a complaint in the Puente Alto Court against those who were responsible for leaking his case file, including twelve images of Pozo's dismembered body, which were circulated on the internet via chain emails.

Outcome 
In 2007, the South Prosecutor's Office concluded that Jorge Martínez Arévalo was guilty of the murder and subsequent dismemberment of Hans Pozo.

For his part, Martínez's family insisted that the man did not commit suicide, but was shot by the Carabineros. However, the Second Santiago Military court later established that his death was due to a self-inflicted gunshot wound.

In March of that year, Pozo's ex-partner, Linda Baeza, filed a complaint against Miguel Martínez Arévalo, Jorge's brother, on the grounds that he was also involved in the crime.

On April 18, 2013, the prosecutor in charge of the case, Pablo Sabaj, requested the dismissal of the case, which was granted by the Puente Alto Guarantee Court. This decision was made because during the seven years of investigation, it was never verified that Jorge had acted with the help of a third party.

In April 2016, Jorge Martínez's widow filed an appeal for protection in the San Miguel Court of Appeals to order the cessation of reports and audiovisual publications, both for her and her daughter, and for all the information relating to the Hans Pozo case. This legal action, which is protected by the right to be forgotten, was specifically aimed at free-to-air television channels.

Legacy 
Hans Pozo's case inspired some literary works, such as Pozo and The Sin of El Rucio: Keys to the crime of Hans Pozo, both published in 2007.

The playwright Luis Barrales Guzmán premiered his play H.P. (Hans Pozo) in 2007, which received the 'Best Literary Work' award from the municipality of Santiago and the National Council for Books and Reading.

Also in 2007, visual artist Felipe Santander presented his work Hilvanado at Galería Bech, which included a series of compositions made of synthetic leather and other materials that represented different scenes from the life of Hans Pozo.

In 2009, the docufiction El Rucio, the story of Hans Pozo was released, with actor Julio César Serrano playing the role of Pozo.

In 2018, the Chilean poet Clemente Riedemann published the book Riedemann Blues, which contains a poem titled "Hans Pozo blues".

In Puente Alto, near Marta Brunet, where some of Pozo's remains were found, people moved by his story erected a small animita to venerate him. Over time, some followers of Hans Pozo began to attribute miracles to him, for which reason various gifts and offerings in gratitude are given at the animita.

References 

2006 murders in Chile
2006 in Chile
Deaths by firearm in Chile
Deaths by person in Chile
Male murder victims
Murder in Chile
Murder trials
Trials in Chile
People murdered in Chile
March 2006 events in South America